CBC Halifax refers to:
CBHA-FM, CBC Radio One on 90.5 FM
CBH-FM, CBC Radio 2 on 102.7 FM
CBHT-DT, CBC Television on channel 3

SRC Halifax refers to:
CBAF-FM-5, Première Chaîne on 92.3 FM
CBAX-FM, Espace musique on 91.5 FM
CBHFT, Télévision de Radio-Canada on channel 13, rebroadcaster of CBAFT